Maliattha concinnimacula, known generally as the red-spotted maliattha or red-spotted lithacodia, is a species of moth in the family Noctuidae (the owlet moths).

The MONA or Hodges number for Maliattha concinnimacula is 9050.

References

Further reading

 
 
 

Eustrotiinae
Articles created by Qbugbot
Moths described in 1852